Live is the first live album by the British rock band UFO, recorded in Tokyo, Japan, on 25 September 1971. It was initially released exclusively in Japan in December 1971 entitled U.F.O. Landed Japan. It was later released abroad from 1972 onwards with different titles, such as UFO Live in Japan and UFO Lands in Tokyo.

The album features the original lineup of the band, with Mick Bolton on guitar, and consists of songs from their first two space-rock albums and cover versions of blues songs. All of the tracks are in a jam-oriented style that is very different from the aggressive, song-oriented style they would be later known for.  It was the last album to feature Mick Bolton on guitar. He would be replaced with Michael Schenker.

The album was reissued on the Flying, The Early Years compilation, along with all of the band's other pre-Schenker work.

Track listing
Side one
 "C'mon Everybody" (Jerry Capehart, Eddie Cochran) – 4:10
 "Who Do You Love?" (Ellas McDaniel) – 9:00
 "Loving Cup" (Paul Butterfield) – 5:10

Side two
"Prince Kajuku"/"The Coming of Prince Kajuku" (Mick Bolton, Phil Mogg, Andy Parker, Pete Way) – 8:20
 "Boogie for George" (Bolton, Mogg, Parker, Way) – 11:30
 "Follow You Home" (Way) – 6:00

Bonus track on Repretoire CD release
"Loving Cup" (Single edit) – 3:59

Chart

Personnel
 Phil Mogg – vocals
 Mick Bolton – guitar
 Pete Way – bass
 Andy Parker – drums

References

External links
 

1971 live albums
UFO (band) live albums
Live space rock albums
Decca Records live albums
Stateside Records live albums